Nicholas J. Conard, (born July 23, 1961 in Cincinnati) is an American and naturalized German citizen who works as an archaeologist and prehistorian. He is the director of the department for early prehistory and quaternary ecology and the founding director of the Institute of Archaeological Sciences (Institut für Naturwissenschaftliche Archäologie) at the University of Tübingen in Germany.

Education and career

Conard received his bachelor's degrees in Anthropology and Chemistry at the University of Rochester, New York in 1983. He continued at the University of Rochester to be awarded with an interdisciplinary master's degree in physics, geology and anthropology in 1986. Conard earned an additional master's degree and a doctoral degree in anthropology at Yale University in 1988 and 1990, respectively. After achieving his Ph.D. he worked at the University of Connecticut as an assistant professor in Anthropology from 1991 until 1993. In the mid-1990s, he worked  at the Römisch-Germanisches Zentralmuseum in Mainz/Neuwied as a Humboldt Research Fellow. He was appointed to the position Chair of Early Prehistory and Quaternary Ecology at the University of Tübingen in 1995.

Research

Conard is the project leader of a team working on an archaeological examination of the Hohle Fels cave in the Swabian Jura area, a low mountain range in Baden-Württemberg, Germany, bounded by the Danube in the southeast and the upper Neckar in the northwest. This is near where the Löwenmensch figurine, (meaning "lion-human") was found in 1939, forgotten due to the war, and only reexamined following a 1997 discovery of additional parts of the figurine. Conard's team has been exploring the Hohe Fels site for approximately twenty years. Recently they uncovered more fragments of human female figurines that date to the Aurignacian, an Upper Paleolithic culture, confirming dates exceeded only by the Löwenmensch figurine and that such female figurines are more widely distributed than thought previously.

Honors and awards

 Order of Merit of Baden-Württemberg
 Member of the Heidelberg Academy for Sciences and Humanities

Selected articles

 Riehl, S., M. Zeidi, and N. J. Conard. 2013. Emergence of Agriculture in the Foothills of the Zagros Mountains of Iran. Science. 341: 65-67.
 Conard, N. J., M. Malina, and S. C. Münzel. 2009. New flutes document the earliest musical tradition in southwestern Germany. Nature 460: 737-740.
 Conard, N. J. 2009. A female figurine from the basal Aurignacian of Hohle Fels Cave in southwestern Germany. Nature 459: 248-252.
 Conard, N. J., P. M. Grootes, and F. H. Smith. 2004. Unexpectedly recent dates for human remains from Vogelherd. Nature 430: 198-201.
 Conard, N. J. 2003. Paleolithic ivory sculptures from southwestern Germany and the origins  of figurative art. Nature 426: 830-832.
 Conard, N. J., D. L. Asch, N. B. Asch, D. Elmore, H. E. Gove, M. Rubin, J. A. Brown, M. D. Wiant, K. B. Farnsworth, and T. G. Cook. 1983. Prehistoric Horticulture in Illinois: Accelerator Radiocarbon Dating of the Evidence. University of Rochester Nuclear Structure Research Laboratory Report 57.

References

External links
 http://www.geo.uni-tuebingen.de/en/work-groups/prehistory-archaeological-sciences/institut/early-prehistory-and-quaternary-ecology.html
 http://www.geo.uni-tuebingen.de/en/work-groups/prehistory-archaeological-sciences/early-prehistory-and-quaternary-ecology/staff-directory/prof-nicholas-j-conard-phd/curriculum-vitae.html

Living people
1961 births
American archaeologists
Recipients of the Order of Merit of Baden-Württemberg